Khaled al-Anani (born 14 March 1971 in Giza) is an Egyptian Egyptologist and was the Egyptian Minister of Tourism and Antiquities.

Career
Al-Anani studied Egyptology at the Helwan University with the aim of becoming a tourist guide. He later obtained a MAS and PhD at the Paul Valéry University Montpellier in 2001. He then became a professor of Egyptology at the University of Helwan, Department of Tourist Guides, then in the Faculty of Tourism and Hotel Management in 2011. He also teaches the Ancient Egyptian language at several universities around the world, including the University of Palermo, Paul-Valéry-Montpellier University and the Brandenburg University of Technology. In addition, he became a member of several scientific institutions, notably being a corresponding member of the German Archaeological Institute in Berlin, as well as an associate researcher and member of the board of directors of the French Institute of Oriental Archeology (IFAO). In October 2014, he became the 18th director-general of the National Museum of Egyptian Civilisation (NMEC).

On 23 March 2016, al-Anani became the Minister of Antiquities in the government of Sherif Ismail. During his tenure, he managed to secure funds to build the Grand Egyptian Museum, and renovate other historical buildings such as the Baron Empain Palace, Graeco-Roman Museum and Eliyahu Hanavi Synagogue. He also organizes press conferences following archaeological discoveries to promote tourism. In addition, he aims to combat extremism by encouraging the Egyptian population to take a greater interest in the ancient Egypt history.

When the government of Mostafa Madbouly was appointed in 2018, he retained his post. The field of Tourism was added to his portfolio during the reshuffle of December 22, 2019, to become the Minister of Tourism and Antiquities.

Honours
  Knight of the Ordre des Arts et des Lettres (2015)
  Silver Medal for Merit to Culture – Gloria Artis (2020)

References

1971 births
Living people
People from Giza
Helwan University alumni
University of Montpellier alumni
Academic staff of Helwan University
Egyptian Egyptologists
Antiquities ministers of egypt
Chevaliers of the Ordre des Arts et des Lettres
Recipients of the Silver Medal for Merit to Culture – Gloria Artis
21st-century Egyptian politicians